JP Morgan Russian Securities is a large British investment trust dedicated to investments in Russia. Established in 2002, the company is listed on the London Stock Exchange. The chairman is Eric Sanderson. Following the 2022 Russian invasion of Ukraine, the company announced that it would shift its investment strategy towards Emerging Europe, the Middle East and Africa.

References

External links
  Official site

Investment trusts of the United Kingdom
JPMorgan Chase